The Utamboni is a river of southwestern mainland Equatorial Guinea. It flows along the border with Gabon and forms part of the Muni Estuary along with the Mitimele River (the upper part of the river), Mitong River, Mandyani River, Congue River,  and Mven River. The river becomes the Utamboni River along the border with Gabon.

References

Rivers of Equatorial Guinea